George Wheeler Hinman (November 19, 1864 - March 31, 1927) was an American writer and newspaper publisher.  He also served as the president of Marietta College in Ohio from 1913-1918.

Biography
Hinman was born in Mount Morris, New York in 1864, and graduated from Hamilton College in New York in 1884.  After working at newspapers in Chicago and St. Louis, he obtained a masters and Ph.D. degree from Heidelberg University in 1889.  He then joined The Sun in New York, where he remained on the staff for about ten years.  Around 1898 he took a position as editor and manager of the Chicago Inter Ocean, and bought a controlling share in the paper in 1906.  He sold the paper to H. H. Kohlsaat in 1912.

From 1913-18, he was President of Marietta College in Ohio, where he started a new literary magazine, The Olio. He later became publisher of the Chicago Herald and Examiner.

Personal
Hinman married Maude M. Sturtevant on January 28, 1891, and had five children.

He died at his home in Winnetka, Illinois on March 31, 1927.

References

1864 births
1927 deaths
People from Mount Morris, New York
American newspaper editors
American newspaper publishers (people)
Hamilton College (New York) alumni
Marietta College people
Heidelberg University alumni
Fellows of the American Physical Society